Lights of New York may refer to:

 Lights of New York (1928 film), the first all-talking feature film
 Lights of New York (1916 film), a silent drama film directed by Van Dyke Brooke

See also
The Lights of New York